The Iglesia ni Cristo chapel in Washington D.C. in the United States is located along 16th Street. It used to be a place of worship and school of the Saints Constantine and Helen Greek Orthodox Church. The Iglesia ni Cristo through the  Allison James Estates & Homes purchased the chapel building from Summit Commercial which represents the Greek Orthodox church for $9.2 million in November 2012. It was renovated by the Iglesia as a house of worship for its own adherents.

The complex composed with two building. The former school building within the complex is three stories high and measures .

References

Church buildings converted to a different denomination
Washington D.C.
Chapels in Washington, D.C.